Megan "Meg" Ryan (born 3 April 2002) is an Irish artistic gymnast who competed at the 2020 Olympic Games.

Personal life 
Megan Ryan was born on 3 April 2002 in Cork. She began gymnastics at age five after watching her older sister Hayley train. She also played Gaelic football before she decided to concentrate on gymnastics.
Ryan received the Echo Women in Sport award in 2019.

Career

Junior 
Ryan won the gold medal on every event at the 2016 Irish Championships, except for the uneven bars where she won the silver medal. She then competed at the European Championships where she finished fifty-third in the all-around during the qualification round. In 2017, Ryan once again won the junior all-around at the Irish Championships. She then competed at the European Youth Summer Olympic Festival with Jane Heffernan and Emma Slevin, and they finished eighteenth in the team competition. Individually, Ryan finished thirty-third in the all-around.

Senior 
Ryan competed at the 2019 European Championships where she finished forty-ninth in the all-around during the qualification round. She then won the gold medal in the all-around at the senior Irish Championships. At the Mersin Challenge Cup, she won the silver medal on the uneven bars behind Nazli Savranbasi. This was Ireland's first medal at the women's FIG World Cup. She then competed at the 2019 World Championships where she finished ninety-fifth in the all-around in the qualification round. Due to this result, she was initially the first reserve for the Olympic Games. However, after North Korea withdrew from the Olympics, Ryan received the spot that initially went to Kim Su-jong.

At the 2021 European Championships, she decided to only compete on the uneven bars, balance beam, and floor exercise in order to build up towards the Olympic Games.

References

External links 
 
 
 
 
 

2002 births
Living people
Irish female artistic gymnasts
Sportspeople from Cork (city)
Gymnasts at the 2020 Summer Olympics
Olympic gymnasts of Ireland